Dowlais is a village and community of the county borough of Merthyr Tydfil, in Wales. At the 2011 census the electoral ward had a population of 6,926, The population of the Community being 4,270 at the 2011 census having excluded Pant.  Dowlais is notable within Wales and Britain for its historic association with ironworking; once employing, through the Dowlais Iron Company, over 7,000 people, the works being the largest in the world at one stage.

Name
The name is derived from the Welsh du meaning 'black' and glais meaning 'stream'.

History
Dowlais came to prominence in the 18th and 19th centuries because of its iron and steelworks. By the mid-1840s there were between 5000 and 7000 men, women and children employed in the Dowlais works. During the early to mid 1800s the ironworks were operated by Sir John Josiah Guest and (from 1833) his wife Lady Charlotte Guest. Charlotte Guest introduced welfare schemes for the ironworkers. She provided for a church and a library. The school (dating from 1819) was improved and extended, becoming "probably the most important and most progressive not only in the industrial history of South Wales, but of the whole of Britain". In the 1850s, after Sir John's death, the works became under the control of a board of trustees. In 1865 the Bessemer steel making process was introduced to Dowlais, with £33,000 being spent on a new steelworks. Steel production at Dowlais eventually ceased in 1936 due to the Great Depression, although the iron foundry continued until 1987.

Dowlais was originally part of the parish of Merthyr Tydfil. In 1872 the population was 15,590. Its total population at the 2011 census was 6,926.

Governance
Dowlais was an electoral ward to Mid Glamorgan County Council from 1973 to 1996.

Since 1996 Dowlais has been a ward to Merthyr Tydfil County Borough Council. In 2003 Dowlais was represented by an independent councillor, John Pritchard, who was also Mayor of Merthyr Tydfil.

Notable buildings
Little remains of the works that once sustained the community throughout the Victorian era until the 1930s, the two notable buildings that remain are the Engine House, now used a community centre and the stable block which is now social housing.

Dowlais House, which has now been demolished, was once home to Sir John Josiah Guest and Lady Charlotte Guest, and it was at Dowlais House that Lady Guest translated the Mabinogion. The Guest Memorial Library (1863); commissioned by Lady Guest and designed by Charles Barry, still stands.

St John's Church, a Grade II listed building, contains the tombs and burial places of several notable people, including Sir John Guest who had the church built in 1827. St John's closed in 1997 but has received several hundred thousand pounds of Welsh Government money to preserve it.

In its heyday, Dowlais had numerous nonconformist chapels. Almost all have disappeared although the buildings of Bethania (Independent) and Hebron (Calvinistic Methodist) are now used by evangelical congregations. Others have been demolished including Bryn Seion and Gwernllwyn.

Sport and leisure
Dowlais is home to rugby union club, Dowlais RFC.

Notable residents
 Laura Ashley, fashion designer
 Dai Astley, association footballer
 Richard Davies, actor
 Thomas Nathaniel Davies, artist
 David William Evans, lawyer and international rugby union player
 Horace Evans, 1st Baron Evans, royal physician
 Lady Charlotte Guest, first translator of the Mabinogion into English
 Ivor Guest, 1st Baron Wimborne, industrialist
 John Josiah Guest, engineer
 Richard Harrington, actor
 Robert Alwyn Hughes, artist
 Heinz Koppel, artist
 Gustavius Payne, artist
 Robert Rees, tenor
 Glanmor Williams, historian
 Gwyn Alf Williams, historian

Sources

References

External links
Old Merthyr Tydfil: Dowlais - Historical Photographs of Dowlais, Merthyr Tydfil.
Photos of Dowlais and surrounding area on geograph.org.uk

Villages in Merthyr Tydfil County Borough
Communities in Merthyr Tydfil County Borough
Wards of Merthyr Tydfil County Borough
Mid Glamorgan electoral wards